Krzysztof Tuduj (born 25 April 1981 in Warsaw) is a Polish lawyer, activist, and politician. He has been the second vice-chairman of the National Movement and a deputy in the Sejm since 2019.

In 2019, he was elected to Sejm, starting from the Confederation Freedom and Independence list in the Wrocław constituency.

He is married and raises foster children.

References

External links
 Krzysztof Tuduj · Konfederacja

National Movement (Poland) politicians
Living people
Politicians from Warsaw
Members of the Polish Sejm 2019–2023
1981 births